Jashari, meaning "of/relating to Jashar", is a surname. Notable people with the surname include:

 Adem Jashari (1955–1998), Kosovar soldier
 Ardon Jashari (born 2002), Swiss footballer
 Hamëz Jashari (1950-1998), Kosovar soldier
 Ismet Jashari (born 1967), Albanian member of the UCK movement
 Kaqusha Jashari (born 1946), Kosovo Albanian politician and engineer
 Ragip Jashari (1961–1999), Albanian politician and patriot.

See also
 Stadiumi Olimpik Adem Jashari, Mitrovica, Kosovo football ground
 Stadiumi Tefik Jashari, Shijak, Albania football ground

Albanian-language surnames
Patronymic surnames